Junay or junai, is a Filipino packed rice dish wrapped in banana leaves with burnt coconut meat and various spices. It originates from the Tausug people of the Sulu Archipelago. It is made by boiling rice in coconut milk until half-cooked. It is then wrapped in banana leaves with pamapa (powdered mixed spices), oil, salt, and siyunog lahing (powdered burnt coconut meat). It is further steamed in water until fully cooked. The spices and burnt coconut are also sold pre-mixed and are known as pipis itum.

See also
 Putli mandi
Pastil
Tiyula itum
Tamu
Suman

References

Rice dishes
Philippine rice dishes
Culture of Sulu